Rzeźnik drzew is collection of 12 short stories written by Polish fantasy writer Andrzej Pilipiuk. The stories are not related in storyline, however in some stories there is a recurring character from  Pilipiuk's works - Dr. Skórzewski.

References

2009 short story collections
Fabryka Słów books
21st-century Polish literature
Polish short story collections
Fantasy short story collections